The Best of Willie Nelson is a 1982 compilation album by country singer Willie Nelson.

Track listing 
Funny How Time Slips Away
Hello Walls
The Part Where I Cry
Undo the Right
Wake Me When It's Over
Crazy
Touch Me
One Step Beyond
Three Days
Half a Man
Where My House Lives
Mr. Record Man
Darkness on the Face of the Earth

Personnel 
Willie Nelson - Guitar, vocals

Chart performance

1982 compilation albums
Willie Nelson compilation albums